Phillip Hone Coffin (born 24 July 1964) is a former New Zealand rugby union player.

In 1996, the inaugural year of the Super 12, Coffin was not selected for his local team, the Chiefs, but was picked up for the Wellington based franchise in the draft. After his strong performances for the Hurricanes he was selected for the New Zealand national side, the All Blacks, on the 1996 tour of South Africa, playing three matches but no internationals. These games were the wins against Eastern Province and Western Transvaal and off the bench in the draw with Griqualand West.

He played for New Zealand Māori from 1991 to 1997.

References

1964 births
Living people
People from Ōtorohanga
New Zealand rugby union players
New Zealand international rugby union players
Māori All Blacks players
Wellington rugby union players
Hurricanes (rugby union) players
King Country rugby union players
Rugby union props
Rugby union players from Waikato